Klempen is a German typographical term for the omission of a space after a word or punctuation mark (e.g. comma, full stop, exclamation mark, question mark, dash).

Its counterpart (and derivation) is Plenken, the incorrect addition of a space before punctuation marks.

Etymology 
Klempen is a constructed word from the German plenken (meaning "to add inappropriate spaces", itself a borrowing from the English blank) and klemmen ("to wedge", possibly a reference to Linotype machine operators' slang term wedges for the spacebands used to implement justified spacing), exchanging the k and p in such a way as to suggest both phonetically and orthographically its relationship and opposite meaning.

Both are internet coinages, dating from Johannes "Jödel" Leckebusch's introduction of plenken on MausNet in 1988 and now widely used on German newsgroups.

Examples

See also

References 
 Typografische Verbrechen: Plenken und Klempen
 Bedeutung und Herkunft der Wörter Plenk, plenken
 Was ist 'Plenken'?
 DIN 5008, Schreib- und Gestaltungsregeln für die Textverarbeitung

Typography
Whitespace

de:Plenk#Klemp